The National Sports Awards is the collective name given to the six sports awards of the Republic of India. It is awarded annually by the Ministry of Youth Affairs and Sports. They are presented by the President of India in the same ceremony at the Rashtrapati Bhavan, usually on 29 August. Since 2004, Tenzing Norgay National Adventure Award is also given alongside the other sports awards. , a total of 1,259 individuals and organizations have been awarded the various National Sports Awards.

List of awards

Maulana Abul Kalam Azad Trophy
Maulana Abul Kalam Azad Trophy was instituted in the year 1956–1957. It is given to the university for "top performance in the inter-university tournaments" over the period of the last one year.

Arjuna Award
Arjuna Award was instituted in the year 1961. It is given to sportspersons for "consistent outstanding performance" over the period of last four years.

Dronacharya Award
Dronacharya Award instituted in the year 1985, it is given to coaches for "producing medal winners at prestigious international events". The award comprises "a bronze statuette of Dronacharya, a certificate, ceremonial dress, and a cash prize of ".

Major Dhyan Chand Khel Ratna
Major Dhyan Chand Khel Ratna was instituted in the year 1991–1992. It is given to sportspersons for "most outstanding performance by a sportsperson" over the period of last four years. The award comprises "a medallion, a certificate, and a cash prize of ".

Dhyan Chand Award
Dhyan Chand Award was instituted in the year 2002. It is given to individuals for "lifetime contribution to sports development". The award comprises "a Dhyan Chand statuette, a certificate, ceremonial dress, and a cash prize of ".

Rashtriya Khel Protsahan Puruskar
Rashtriya Khel Protsahan Puruskar was instituted in the year 2009. It is given to organizations (both private and public) and individuals for "playing a visible role in the area of sports promotion and development" over the period of last three years.

Recipients
, a total of 1,259 sportspersons, coaches, universities and organizations have been awarded the various National Sports Awards. Forty-three sportspersons have been awarded the Rajiv Gandhi Khel Ratna. The Arjuna Award has been awarded to 881 individuals and one group award to 20 mountaineers. Seventy-five sportspersons have been awarded the Dhyan Chand Award. One hundred and twenty-nine coaches have been awarded the Dronacharya Award, out of which 35 been awarded in the lifetime category. A total of six universities have been awarded the Maulana Abul Kalam Azad Trophy 64 times. Thirty-nine organizations and individuals have been awarded the Rashtriya Khel Protsahan Puruskar for sports promotion 47 times.

Lists of recipients

By year

By sport

Olympic sports

Non-Olympic sports

Parasports

 Parasports

Explanatory notes

References

External links

Official Website

Indian sports trophies and awards
Ministry of Youth Affairs and Sports